Chris Barbosa is an American record producer from New York.

Early career
In 1981, the Bronx- Puerto Rican born Barbosa was a reporting DJ on New York's WKTU. This process entailed the radio station calling up select club and mobile DJs, who would then report to the radio station, these reports would determine which records were added to the station's playlist. Other DJs who participated in this process included Ralph Rivera Jr, Nelson Cruz, Frank Forti Jr and Vin Rivera. (from New York City Mixologists Disco Spinners), whose variety show had a part in Twister's huge success.

In 1983, an executive from Emergency Records named Sergio Cossa signed Barbosa to do production work with the record label. Some of Barbosa's musical influences were Arthur Baker and John Robie, the duo that invented electro funk with their production of Afrika Bambaataa's "Planet Rock". Later that year, he teamed up with Mark Liggett to produce a vocal version of "Fire and Ice", the instrumental track of "Let the Music Play". They used a young contemporary R&B background vocalist named Shannon Brenda Greene, later changing her name to simply Shannon. This track was produced differently from the rest of the electro-funk records. It had a more Latin American-based rhythm with a heavy syncopated drum sound than the records produced by Baker and Robie. This style of electro funk was defined as "freestyle music" because of the way it was produced and mixed. Barbosa is widely credited as the genre's founder.

In September 1983, the 12-inch single of the song was released. After the initial success of the song, Shannon went on to record a full-length album of the same name. This Grammy nominated single was frequently played on radio stations nationwide. Her album was released in February 1984, giving us another hit Give Me Tonight making it the first freestyle album in dance music history, eventually being certified gold (selling over 500,000 copies at the time). Both the 12-inch and 7-inch singles were also certified gold.

In 1984, Barbosa and Liggett sought out other session singers to lay down tracks on more freestyle songs. These artists included Nolan Thomas - "Yo Little Brother", Jay Novelle - "If This Ain't Love" and Xena- "On The Upside".  Barbosa also played keyboards, programmed sequencers and produced Robin Gibb's album, Secret Agent.

Barbosa has been awarded Multiple RIAA Certified Gold, Platinum & Silver Records for various projects as well as an Ampex Golden Reel Award for "Let The Music Play"

1986–present
In 1986, Emergency Records stopped signing new artists, forcing Barbosa and Liggett to launch their own Ligosa Records. The duo immediately signed Monet and George Lamond. In addition, their subsidiary, Ligosa Entertainment produced songs for upcoming freestyle music acts such as Judy Torres (dubbed the "Queen of Freestyle"), Sa-Fire, and Mark Kalfa. Barbosa found chart success in 1990 with Lamond's "Bad of the Heart", which hit the Billboard Top 100 and peaked at #25.

In 1995, Barbosa and Liggett dismantled their company and parted ways. Barbosa continued producing for underground artists. In 1999, Shannon invited him back to update her 1980s singles "Let the Music Play" and "Give Me Tonight".

Barbosa was also affiliated with the tape editing scene. Barbosa served as the Director of Multimedia Services at Wyckoff Heights Medical Center in New York City from 2006-12. In September 2011, he relocated to Orlando, Florida; he was a remote worker until January 2012.

He is currently volunteering at IEC House of Worship where he is a Camera Operator, and a Producer/Master Control Operator/Engineer utilizing a NewTek Tri Caster 855 Live Multi-Camera Video Production system.

Personal life
Barbosa is married with two children. His son Brandon is autistic. Barbosa is also involved in various charities and organizations related to autism.

References

External links
Chris Barbosa Interview
 

Record producers from New York (state)
American freestyle musicians
Year of birth missing (living people)
Living people